Leticia Lee McKenna (born 7 August 2002) is an Australian soccer player who currently plays as a midfielder for Melbourne City. She has previously played for Perth Glory and Brisbane Roar.

Club career
McKenna debuted in the 2018 season as a 16 year old for Perth Glory, and played 12 matches in which she scored 2 goals, and playing in Perth's winning semi-final team, where she provided an assist for Sam Kerr. McKenna was one of a number of teenagers in the Perth team, and received praise from Kerr, the team's star player, for her abilities and maturity.

McKenna also scored a goal in her debut, a 4–4 draw with Canberra United in round 2 of the 2018–19 W-League season. She also played for the Australian under 19 team during their qualification for the 2019 AFC U-19 Women's Championship

McKenna was also an ambassador for the 2019 Smarter than Smoking Kicking Off Healthy Clubs initiative.

In November 2020, McKenna signed with Brisbane Roar for the 2020–21 W-League season.

In September 2021, McKenna joined Melbourne City on a two-year contract.

References

Australian women's soccer players
2002 births
Perth Glory FC (A-League Women) players
Brisbane Roar FC (A-League Women) players
Melbourne City FC (A-League Women) players
Living people
Women's association football midfielders